Goldthorpe and Thurnscoe Halt was a small railway station on the Dearne Valley Railway (DVR) situated between Harlington Halt and Great Houghton Halt. It served the village of Goldthorpe in South Yorkshire, England.

The station opened on 3 June 1912. At first, trains were operated on behalf of the DVR by the Lancashire and Yorkshire Railway; when that company amalgamated with the London and North Western Railway on 1 January 1922, the combined organisation (also known as the London and North Western Railway) absorbed the DVR on the same day.

The station closed on 10 September 1951.

References

Disused railway stations in Barnsley
Former Dearne Valley Railway stations
Railway stations in Great Britain opened in 1912
Railway stations in Great Britain closed in 1951
1912 establishments in England